Along Came a Spider is a crime thriller novel, and the first novel in James Patterson's series about forensic psychologist Alex Cross. First published in 1993, its success has led to twenty six sequels as of 2021. It was adapted into a film of the same name in 2001, starring Morgan Freeman as Cross.

Plot
Washington, D.C. homicide investigator and forensic psychologist Alex Cross investigates the brutal murders of two black prostitutes and an infant. Then, at an exclusive private school, math teacher Gary Soneji kidnaps Maggie Rose Dunne and Michael Goldberg. Cross is pulled off the murder case to investigate the kidnapping instead. Angry because he feels everyone cares more about two rich white children than three dead black people, he meets Jezzie Flannagan, the head of the children's Secret Service detail. At an old farmhouse, Soneji buries the children alive in a specially made coffin. Angered by FBI agent Roger Graham's contemptuous comments about him on TV, Soneji later impersonates a reporter and kills Graham. Meanwhile, Cross, his partner John Sampson and the FBI search Soneji's apartment, discovering his obsession with kidnappings, particularly that of the Lindbergh baby, and his desire to become a world-famous criminal.

Some time later, Michael Goldberg's corpse is discovered, and the Dunnes receive a telegram demanding $10 million. Cross, Sampson and the FBI investigate, and Cross begins an affair with Jezzie Flannagan. He is ordered to deliver the money to Walt Disney World in Orlando, wondering how Soneji knows about his involvement. A man takes him on a plane, flying to a small island and taking the money, but never delivering Maggie Rose. At the old farmhouse, police officers find the empty graves where the children were held. Soneji returns to his home in Wilmington, Delaware, where it is revealed he has a wife and a daughter.

In Washington DC, Soneji, dressed as a public utility employee, murders a teacher from the private school. Cross and Sampson are sent to the scene and, seeing the way he mutilated the body, quickly realize that Soneji is also behind the killings they investigated before and after the kidnapping. In the murdered prostitutes' neighborhood, an elderly woman recalls a man going door to door selling heating systems. They soon find out that a man named Gary Murphy works for the company, and put observation on his family home in Wilmington, but Soneji manages to escape. A day later, he walks into a McDonald's and holds several people hostage. Soneji is almost killed, but Cross saves him, as he believes Soneji knows where Maggie is. The criminal promises Cross will regret saving his life.

The trial of Gary Soneji/Murphy lasts eleven months. Cross hypnotizes him several times, learning he seems to have a split personality; Gary Murphy, his everyday persona, is a gentle family man, while Gary Soneji is a vicious sociopath. Despite the defense's best effort at an insanity plea, Soneji is imprisoned. Meanwhile, Cross learns that someone was following Soneji and knew about the kidnapping. Cross suspects Mike Devine and Charley Chakely, the Secret Service agents in charge of protecting Maggie Rose and Michael when they were kidnapped. He meets with Soneji, who confirms he may have been followed. He did not make the connection until he recognized the man at his trial: Mike Devine.

Cross meets with the FBI, who have believed for some time that Devine and Chakely took the ransom money, hiring and later murdering the pilot from Florida. Cross also learns that none other than Jezzie Flannagan masterminded the kidnapping using her lover, Devine, as a pawn. Around the same time, Soneji escapes from prison and goes to Washington, where he tortures Devine to find out where the ransom money is. After retrieving the money, he kills Devine.

Cross takes Flannagan on a Caribbean getaway, and confronts her about her actions. She explains that Devine and Chakely noticed Soneji driving by the Goldberg house, and followed him. The ransom was her idea, and they removed Maggie Rose after Michael died accidentally. Flannagan is arrested based on a recording Sampson made of the conversation, and Maggie Rose is found with a family in South America, where she had been living for the past two years.

Shortly after this, Soneji attacks Cross at his Washington home, attempting to kill his grandmother and children. Losing the fight, Soneji is hunted through the capital and eventually cornered on Pennsylvania Avenue, where he takes two children hostage. Soneji is about to shoot Cross, but Sampson shoots Soneji first, wounding him. Some time later, Charley Chakely and Jezzie Flannagan are executed for their crimes, while Soneji is locked up in a mental institution. He writes a last taunting letter to Cross and bribes a guard to leave it on Cross' windshield. Disturbed but unwilling to let Soneji disrupt his life any further, Cross returns home to spend time with his family.

Characters
Alex Cross: An African-American forensic psychologist as well as a detective, described as good-looking and well-built. He is often referred to as "Doctor Detective". Despite being very dedicated to his job, he manages to be a devoted father to his two children. His wife, Maria, was killed in a shooting before the novel begins and he is romantically involved with Jezzie Flannagan before he finds out her role in Maggie Rose's disappearance.

Jezzie Flannagan: Before the kidnapping of Maggie Rose and Michael Goldberg, she held an esteemed position in the Secret Service—the first woman ever to hold the position. She is described as very beautiful, though she confides in Alex that she wishes she'd been born plain so she wouldn't have to face as much sexism in her workplace. As a white woman romantically involved with Alex (an African-American man), she faces racism, though she handles it better than Alex does. Both her parents were alcoholics, and her father committed suicide. She names them as "smart failures", or brilliant people who never made anything of their lives. When Alex confronts her about her betrayal, she admits that she approached him at first strictly to get information on what the cops knew, but that she later fell in love with him and his children.

Gary Murphy/Soneji: As a boy, he was physically and sexually abused by his father and stepmother, which caused him to develop a split personality. Gary Murphy is a normal, all-American father and husband, while Gary Soneji is a cold-blooded predator who fantasizes about kidnapping and burying a baby alive at twelve and orchestrates the kidnapping of Maggie Rose and Michael Goldberg. He has an obsession with being famous, and wants to be the most feared criminal in America.

In other media

Film

A film adaptation of the same name was released on April 6, 2001, starring Morgan Freeman as Alex Cross, Monica Potter as Jezzie Flannagan, and Michael Wincott as Gary Soneji. The adaptation makes substantial changes to the plot, omitting much of Soneji's background and his split personality, as well as changing the identity of the kidnapped children's parents and many characters' eventual fate.

References 

1993 American novels
Alex Cross (novel series)
American detective novels
American thriller novels
American novels adapted into films
Little, Brown and Company books
Novels about child abduction
Novels by James Patterson
Novels set in Washington, D.C.